The Henschel Projekt P.87 was a proposed single-engine Schnellbomber design put forth by German aircraft manufacturer Henschel for the Luftwaffe during WWII. It was to utilize the then seldom-used tail-first canard arrangement, swept wings, and two vertical fins mounted on the wingtips.

Design 
In general design, the P.87 was a single-engine, tail-first monoplane design. The unusual arrangement allowed for the crew to all be placed in the nose of the aircraft, ahead of the powerplant & propeller, which would have been quite novel for a propeller-driven aircraft of the time. The P.87 was to be powered by a single rear-mounted Daimler Benz DB 610 engine (the same type used on the Heinkel He 177 heavy bomber) in pusher configuration, driving a single or contra-rotating propeller. It featured an unconventional tail-first canard layout, with the tailplane being located towards the nose of the aircraft and the primary wings being at the rear of the fuselage, along with the vertical fins at said wings' tips. The mainplanes were swept at 30°. The landing gear was of tricycle configuration, with a nosewheel positioned directly below the crew and rear wheels retracting into the wing roots. Offensive armament would have most likely consisted of multiple 30mm MK 108 autocannon in the nose, with bombs either being carried directly underneath the fuselage and wings, and/or in an internal bomb bay.

Cancellation 
The P.87 was theoretically a sound design, but a combination of a lack of experience among German pilots in flying pusher-configuration aircraft, and the unconventional and relatively untested layout, lead to the whole project being dropped to focus on higher priorities. No mock-up or prototype was ever constructed, and no RLM number was designated, with only paper design work ever being done.

References 

Luftwaffe
Bomber aircraft